August Osmyn Dole (February 11, 1816 – December 7, 1876) was an American businessman and optician.

Born in Shelburne, Massachusetts, he moved to Arlington, Wisconsin in 1856 and then to Poynette, Wisconsin in 1866. He owned a mill. Dole served as justice of the peace, town clerk, and on the school board. In 1876, Dole served in the Wisconsin State Assembly as a Republican. He died in Poynette, Wisconsin and was still in office at the time of his death from pneumonia.

References

1816 births
1876 deaths
People from Shelburne, Massachusetts
People from Poynette, Wisconsin
Businesspeople from Wisconsin
School board members in Wisconsin
Republican Party members of the Wisconsin State Assembly
19th-century American politicians
People from Arlington, Wisconsin
19th-century American businesspeople